The Czech Actors' Association has presented its annual Thalia Awards (Czech: Ceny Thálie) since 1993. The award is named after Thalia, the muse of comedy. The 2016 ceremony was broadcast by Česká televize and radio station .

Thalia Awards are presented for the following categories:

 Play
 Opera
 Musical
 Ballet

Recipients 

* A number in parentheses following a performer's name indicates the number of awards received by that performer.

Thalia Awards for Lifetime Achievement 
Nelly Gajerová received a lifetime achievement award at the 1993 ceremony for her achievements in the field of Operetta. An award relating to that specific field has not been conferred since.

Awards for young actors, Special awards

References

External links 
 Official website Thalia Awards (Czech)

Czech theatre awards
Awards established in 1993
1993 establishments in the Czech Republic